Brian Greenfield (born June 6, 1969) is a former American football player with the University of Pittsburgh Panthers and with the Cleveland Browns.

He was selected to the 1990 College Football All-America Team. Greenfield came to Pitt in 1989 from Glendale Community College (Calif.), and was the Panthers' regular punter for the 1989 and 1990 seasons. In 1990, he finished as the second-ranked punter in the nation with a school-record 45.6-yard average. He set a Pitt record for longest punt—a 79-yard boomer against Boston College in 1990—and his 43.5-yard career punting average also established a Pitt record.

Brian was selected as the 2nd pick in the 10th Round of the 1991 NFL Draft, as overall pick #252.  During  his one Season with the Browns 
he recorded no game statistics.

References

External links 
University of Pittsburgh Football First Team All-Americans  
ESPN Draft Tracker
NFL.com Player Statistics

1968 births
Living people
University of Pittsburgh alumni
Pittsburgh Panthers football players
Cleveland Browns players
London Monarchs players
Glendale Vaqueros football players
All-American college football players